Cerca-Cavajal is a commune in the Hinche Arrondissement, in the Centre department of Haiti. It has 17,571 inhabitants.

References

Populated places in Centre (department)
Communes of Haiti